Hiroyuki Kojima   is a Japanese mixed martial artist. He competed in the Welterweight division.

Mixed martial arts record

|-
| Draw
| align=center| 4-4-1
| Takaharu Murahama
| Draw
| Shooto: Shooter's Ambition
| 
| align=center| 2
| align=center| 5:00
| Setagaya, Tokyo, Japan
| 
|-
| Loss
| align=center| 4-4
| Tetsuji Kato
| TKO (punches)
| Shooto: Las Grandes Viajes 6
| 
| align=center| 2
| align=center| 4:28
| Tokyo, Japan
| 
|-
| Win
| align=center| 4-3
| Saburo Kawakatsu
| Decision (unanimous)
| Shooto: Las Grandes Viajes 5
| 
| align=center| 2
| align=center| 5:00
| Tokyo, Japan
| 
|-
| Win
| align=center| 3-3
| Isao Tanimura
| Technical Submission (kimura)
| Shooto: Gig '98 2nd
| 
| align=center| 1
| align=center| 4:37
| Tokyo, Japan
| 
|-
| Loss
| align=center| 2-3
| Takaharu Murahama
| KO (punch)
| Shooto: Las Grandes Viajes 2
| 
| align=center| 1
| align=center| 2:31
| Tokyo, Japan
| 
|-
| Loss
| align=center| 2-2
| Hayato Sakurai
| Decision (unanimous)
| Shooto: Gig
| 
| align=center| 2
| align=center| 5:00
| Tokyo, Japan
| 
|-
| Loss
| align=center| 2-1
| Tetsuji Kato
| Decision (unanimous)
| Shooto: Reconquista 2
| 
| align=center| 2
| align=center| 5:00
| Tokyo, Japan
| 
|-
| Win
| align=center| 2-0
| Yuji Fujita
| Decision (unanimous)
| Shooto: Reconquista 1
| 
| align=center| 3
| align=center| 3:00
| Tokyo, Japan
| 
|-
| Win
| align=center| 1-0
| Yuzo Tateishi
| Submission (kimura)
| Shooto: Let's Get Lost
| 
| align=center| 1
| align=center| 3:00
| Tokyo, Japan
|

See also
List of male mixed martial artists

References

External links
 
 Hiroyuki Kojima at mixedmartialarts.com

Japanese male mixed martial artists
Welterweight mixed martial artists
Living people
Year of birth missing (living people)